Emlagh East Cashel is a stone ringfort (cashel) and National Monument located in County Kerry, Ireland.

Location

History
Emlagh East Cashel is a cashel, a stone ringfort.

References

National Monuments in County Kerry
Archaeological sites in County Kerry